"Love in Vain" (originally "Love in Vain Blues") is a blues song written by American musician Robert Johnson.  Johnson's performancevocal accompanied by his finger-style acoustic guitar playinghas been described as "devastatingly bleak".  He recorded the song in 1937 during his last recording session and in 1939 it was issued as the last of his original 78 rpm records.

"Love in Vain" has elements of earlier Delta blues songs and for a while it was believed to be in the public domain.  In 1969, the Rolling Stones recorded an updated rendition featuring an electric slide guitar solo. The popularity of their adaptation led to a lawsuit over the copyright, which was eventually resolved in favor of Johnson's estate.  Various artists have recorded the song.

Background
In the late 1920s, Johnson began playing the guitar along with a rack-mounted harmonica.  One of his influences was Leroy Carr, whose "How Long–How Long Blues" (1928) was an early favorite.  Johnson later used the melody from Carr's "When the Sun Goes Down" (1935) as the basis for "Love in Vain". Both songs express a yearning and sorrow for the loss of a lover. Johnson also used some lyrics from "Flying Crow Blues" (1932) by the Shreveport Home Wreckers (a duo of Oscar "Buddy" Woods and Ed Schaffer) for the final verse of "Love in Vain".  Sonny Boy Williamson II recorded a song with a similar title, "All My Love in Vain", but different lyrics.

Lyrics and composition
AllMusic's Thomas Ward describes the song as "heartbreakingly potent coming from an artist of Johnson's calibre". He adds:

During the final verses, Johnson calls out to his lover, Willie Mae Powell.  Years later, when she heard "Love in Vain" for the first time, she was visibly moved upon hearing her name.

Releases
In 1939, Vocalion Records issued "Love in Vain Blues", backed by "Preachin' Blues (Up Jumped the Devil)", on a ten-inch 78 rpm record.  It was released after Johnson's death and was the last of his original singles.  After the release of Johnson's first compilation album, King of the Delta Blues Singers (1961), bootleg albums containing more of Johnson's 1930s singles were circulated.  This was the first appearance of the song since its original release.  Columbia Records responded by issuing King of the Delta Blues Singers, Vol. II (1970), which included an alternate take of "Love in Vain". The original single version was finally reissued (along with the alternate) by Columbia on the box set The Complete Recordings (1990).  A remastered version of the alternate take is also included on King of the Delta Blues: The Complete Recordings (1996).

Rolling Stones adaptation
 
The Rolling Stones recorded "Love in Vain" for their 1969 album, Let It Bleed. Critic Richie Unterberger describes it as "as close to the roots of acoustic down-home blues as the Stones ever got".  Rolling Stones guitarist Keith Richards recalled:

In a 1995 interview with Jann Wenner of Rolling Stone magazine, Mick Jagger commented on the song's arrangement:

Live performances of the song appear on Get Yer Ya-Ya's Out (1970) and Stripped (1995).

Lawsuit over copyright
"Love in Vain" (along with "Stop Breakin' Down Blues") was the subject of a lawsuit regarding the copyright for the song. In 2000, the court held that, according to US law, the songs were not in the public domain and that legal title belonged to the Estate of Robert Johnson and its successors.

Recognition and influence
Robert Johnson's original "Love in Vain" was inducted into the Blues Foundation Hall of Fame as part of the 2011 "Robert Johnson Centennial" celebrations.
Jazz singer Madeleine Peyroux adapted it for her 2011 album Standing on the Rooftop. An album review in The Guardian noted, "A major highlight is the echoing, gothic account of Johnson's 'Love in Vain'."

Love in Vain: A Vision of Robert Johnson is the title of a 2012 screenplay by Alan Greenberg. In it, he explores both the known facts and the myth surrounding Johnson.  Keith Richards commented, "Finally someone has captured the central feel of this master musician and his times, and that man is Alan Greenberg. Take my word for it."

Notes
Footnotes

Citations

References

1937 songs
Blues songs
Songs written by Robert Johnson
Robert Johnson songs
The Rolling Stones songs
Song recordings produced by Jimmy Miller
Song recordings produced by Don Law